The 1928–29 season was Chelsea Football Club's twentieth competitive season and fifth consecutive season in the Second Division. The club finished 9th in the league, narrowly missing out on promotion to the First Division.

Table

References

External links
 1928–29 season at stamford-bridge.com

1928–29
English football clubs 1928–29 season